Saputo may refer to:

 Guillermo Saputo (born 1977), Argentine boxer
 Joey Saputo (born 1964), Canadian businessman and son of:
 Lino Saputo (born 1937), Italian-born Canadian businessman

See also
 Saputo Inc., a dairy products company founded by Lino Saputo
 Saputo Stadium, soccer-specific stadium at Olympic Park in Montreal, Quebec, Canada

Surnames of Italian origin